Brahmos may refer to:

 Brahmos, adherents to the religious movement Brahmoism
 BrahMos, a cruise missile